The 2019 Cronulla-Sutherland Sharks season was the 53rd in the club's history. The team was coached by John Morris, who replaced Shane Flanagan after he resigned in January. The Cronulla Sharks were captained by Paul Gallen and Wade Graham and competed in the National Rugby League's 2019 Telstra Premiership.

Milestones 
Round 1: Josh Morris made his debut for the club, after previously playing for the Canterbury-Bankstown Bulldogs.
Round 1: Shaun Johnson made his debut for the club, after previously playing for the New Zealand Warriors and kicked his 1st goal for the club.
Round 1: Briton Nikora made his NRL debut for the club.
Round 1: Blayke Brailey made his NRL debut for the club.
Round 2: John Morris recorded his first victory as head coach.
Round 2: Chad Townsend played his 100th game for the club.
Round 2: Briton Nikora scored his 1st career try.
Round 3: Paul Gallen played his 329th career and club game, eclipsing Andrew Ettingshausen's all-time games record of 328 games.
Round 3: Josh Morris scored his 1st try for the club.
Round 3: Blayke Brailey scored his 1st career try.
Round 4: Bronson Xerri made his NRL debut for the club.
Round 4: Kyle Flanagan kicked his 1st NRL goal for the club.
Round 5: Jayden Brailey played his 50th career game.
Round 6: William Kennedy made his NRL debut for the club.
Round 6: Bronson Xerri scored his 1st career try.
Round 7: Ronaldo Mulitalo made his NRL debut for the club.
Round 8: Braden Hamlin-Uele scored his 1st career try.
Round 9: Aaron Gray scored his 1st try for the club.
Round 9: Paul Gallen kicked his 1st NRL goal for the club.
Round 10: Andrew Fifita played his 200th career game.
Round 11: Chad Townsend played his 150th career game.
Round 11: Kurt Capewell played his 50th career game.
Round 13: Kyle Flanagan scored his 1st career try.
Round 19: Billy Magoulias made his NRL debut for the club.
Round 19: Ronaldo Mulitalo scored his 1st career try.
Round 25: Paul Gallen kicked his 1st NRL field goal for the club.

Fixtures

Pre-season

Regular season

Source:

Finals series

Source:

Ladder

Squad

Player movements
Source:

Losses
 Bessie Aufaga-Toomaga to Central Queensland Capras
 Kurt Dillon to South Sydney Rabbitohs
 Valentine Holmes to New York Jets
 Edrick Lee to Newcastle Knights
 Ricky Leutele to Toronto Wolfpack
 Luke Lewis to retirement
 Isaac Lumelume to Melbourne Storm (mid-season)
 Joseph Paulo to St Helens R.F.C.
 Jesse Ramien to Newcastle Knights
 James Segeyaro to Brisbane Broncos (mid-season)
 Ava Seumanufagai to Leeds Rhinos (mid-season)

Gains

 Jackson Ferris from Cronulla-Sutherland Sharks Jersey Flegg Cup
 Shaun Johnson from New Zealand Warriors
 Jaimin Jolliffe from Newtown Jets (mid-season)
 Josh Morris from Canterbury-Bankstown Bulldogs
 Kayleb Milne from Melbourne Storm (mid-season)
 Ronaldo Mulitalo from Cronulla-Sutherland Sharks Jersey Flegg Cup
 Toby Rudolf from Redcliffe Dolphins
 Braydon Trindall from Cronulla-Sutherland Sharks Jersey Flegg Cup
 Teig Wilton from Cronulla-Sutherland Sharks Jersey Flegg Cup
 Bronson Xerri from Cronulla-Sutherland Sharks Jersey Flegg Cup

Representative honours
The following players have played a first grade representative match in 2019. (C) = Captain

1 – Andrew Fifita was originally selected to play, but was subsequently forced to withdraw following suspension.

Squad statistics 
Statistics Source:

References

Cronulla-Sutherland Sharks seasons
Cronulla-Sutherland Sharks season